Towthorpe is a hamlet in Strensall with Towthorpe civil parish in the unitary authority of the City of York in North Yorkshire, England.

According to the 2001 census, the parish had a population of 1,967. The data for the 2011 census is included in the civil parish of Strensall with Towthorpe, which had a population of 6,047.

The hamlet was historically part of the North Riding of Yorkshire until 1974. It was then a part of the district of Ryedale in North Yorkshire from 1974 until 1996. Since 1996 it has been part of the City of York unitary authority.

Part of the Strensall training area and adjacent Queen Elizabeth Barracks are located to the north east of the hamlet. The training area was formerly Strensall and Towthorpe Common.

References

Hamlets in North Yorkshire